Wes Cooley may refer to:

 Wes Cooley (motorcyclist) (born 1956), American motorcycle road racer
 Wes Cooley (politician) (1932–2015), American politician